The 1902 Montana Agricultural football team was an American football team that represented the Agricultural College of the State of Montana (later renamed Montana State University) during the 1902 college football season.  In its first season under head coach J. E. Flynn, the team compiled a 4–0–1 record and outscored opponents by a total of 94 to 22. With two victories over the Montana School of Mines and a 38–0 victory on Thanksgiving Day over the University of Montana, the Agricultural College was declared to be the champion of Montana.

Schedule

References

Montana Agricultural
Montana State Bobcats football seasons
College football undefeated seasons
Montana Agricultural football